Roughshod is a 1922 American silent Western film directed by B. Reeves Eason and starring Buck Jones, Helen Ferguson, and Ruth Renick.

Plot
As described in a film magazine, Betty Lawson (Ferguson), just in Arizona from New York City, takes pity on Les Artwell (Rollens), suspected of horse stealing, and upbraids 'Steel' Brannon (Jones), foreman of the Triangle L ranch, for dragging the fugitive from his saddle. Later, however, she learns that Artwell is a member of a gang of cattle thieves that is led by 'Satan' Latimer (Flynn). A raid is made on the cattle stock of the Triangle L and Steel is badly wounded in the clash between the ranch men and the outlaws. Betty assists Steel to Les's cabin but there is detained by Satan Latimer, who takes her to a cave in the mountains. Steel follows them to a canyon and, after a terrific fight, whips Latimer and saves Betty.

Cast
 Buck Jones as 'Steel' Brannon (credited as Charles Jones)
 Helen Ferguson as Betty Lawson
 Ruth Renick as Josephine Hamilton
 Maurice 'Lefty' Flynn as 'Satan' Latimer (credited as Maurice B. Flynn)
 Jack Rollens as Les Artwell
 Charles Le Moyne as Denver

References

Bibliography
 Solomon, Aubrey. The Fox Film Corporation, 1915-1935: A History and Filmography. McFarland, 2011.

External links

 
 

1922 films
1922 Western (genre) films
Films directed by B. Reeves Eason
Fox Film films
Silent American Western (genre) films
1920s English-language films
1920s American films